Deaf adder may refer to:

 Acanthophis antarcticus, a.k.a. the death adder, a venomous elapid found in Australia
 Agkistrodon contortrix mokasen, a.k.a. the northern copperhead, a venomous viper species also found in the United States
 Anguis fragilis, a.k.a. slow worm
 Heterodon platirhinos, a.k.a. the eastern hognose snake, a harmless species found the United States